Club Deportivo Buzanada is a Spanish football team based in Arona, in the autonomous community of Canary Islands. Founded in 1976, it plays in Tercera División RFEF – Group 12, holding home matches at Ciudad Deportiva de Maspalomas, with a capacity of 1,000 seats.

Season to season

5 seasons in Tercera División
1 season in Tercera División RFEF

References

External links
Soccerway team profile

Football clubs in the Canary Islands
Sport in Tenerife
Association football clubs established in 1976
1976 establishments in Spain